"The One You Love" is a song written and performed by Canadian-American singer-songwriter Rufus Wainwright. It served as the first single from Wainwright's fourth studio album, Want Two, and was released digitally in the UK on February 28, 2005. Promotional singles distributed to radio stations contained both the album version and a radio edit. 

The song failed to chart in any country.

Track listing

UK digital single
"The One You Love"

Personnel
 Rufus Wainwright – voice, piano, additional vocals, acoustic guitar
 Marius de Vries – programming
 Martha Wainwright – additional vocals
 Gerry Leonard – electric guitar
 Charlie Sexton – electric guitar
 Jeff Hill – bass
 Levon Helm – drums
 Alexis Smith – programming

Music video
The music video for "The One You Love" was directed by George Scott, and features footage from Montreal, London, Cambridge, Brighton and New York City. The video was used to promote the single in the UK, and also appears on Wainwright's music DVD, All I Want.

References

2004 songs
2005 singles
Geffen Records singles
Rufus Wainwright songs
Song recordings produced by Marius de Vries
Songs written by Rufus Wainwright